George Henry Dodd  (16 January 1882 – 21 July 1957) was a South African tennis player. George was the son of Douglas William Dodd, an Anglican minister from Eton, Buckinghamshire, and Elizabeth Saffrona (née Pruen). He competed for South Africa in the tennis event at the 1920 Summer Olympics where he took part in the men's singles and doubles events. In the singles competition he reached the fourth round in which he lost to Ichiya Kumagae in straight sets. In the doubles he partnered Cecil Blackbeard and reached the third round.

Dodd won the 1912 men's singles title at the South African Championships, defeating R.F. Le Sueur in the final in five sets. In addition he was runner-up on five occasions (1914, 1922, 1925, 1928, 1929).

George was married thrice: his first marriage was to Grace Lilian Floquet (1887-1959) at St Mary's Anglican Church, Pretoria on 10 August 1906. They divorced at Johannesburg on 25 January 1921. His second marriage was to Anna Catherine Boshoff at the Johannesburg Magistrate's Court on 1 October 1921; this marriage also culminated in divorce on 26 October 1933 at Johannesburg. George's third and final marriage was to Agnes Ruth Joy Sackville-West (1903-1969), granddaughter of Lionel Sackville-West, 2nd Baron Sackville and Pepita de Oliva on 15 October 1938 at the Johannesburg Magistrate's Court. They were married until his death on 21 July 1957. George died at the Durban sanatorium, his cause of death cited as congestive cardiac failure, uraemia and hypertensive disease. His widow, Ruth, went on to marry Samuel Wells Coutts of Benoni, son of John Alexander Coutts and Sarah Green.

References

External links
 

1882 births
1957 deaths
Cape Colony people
19th-century male tennis players
South African male tennis players
Olympic tennis players of South Africa
Tennis players at the 1920 Summer Olympics
South African people of English descent